Carabobo may refer to:

Places
 Carabobo Province, established 1824, in Gran Colombia
 Carabobo State, Venezuela
 Carabobo (Buenos Aires Underground), metro station in Buenos Aires
 Avenida Carabobo, in Buenos Aires City, Argentina

Other
 , 1st battle of Carabobo
 Battle of Carabobo (1821), 2nd battle of Carabobo
 , in Medellín, Colombia
 Carabobo FC, from Valencia, Venezuela
 University of Carabobo.